This is a list of mayors of Ann Arbor, Michigan, beginning with Ann Arbor's incorporation as a city on April 4, 1851.

References
 Ann Arbor mayors, Political Graveyard website
 Samuel W. Beakes, Past and Present of Washtenaw County (Washtenaw County, Mich.: S.J. Clarke Publishing Co., 1906), for political affiliations prior to 1906.
 Stephen D. Bingham, Early History of Michigan, with Biographies of State Officers, Members of Congress, Judges and Legislators (Lansing: Thorp and Godfrey, 1888).
 Jonathan Marwil, A History of Ann Arbor (Ann Arbor: University of Michigan Press, 1990).
 

Ann Arbor
 
1851 establishments in Michigan